Enteles vicinus is a weevil in the Curculionidae family, which is found in north Queensland.

It was first described by Johannes Faust in 1888.

References

External links
Enteles vicinus: images & occurrence data from Atlas of Living Australia

Curculionidae

Insects of Australia

Insects described in 1888